Aigar Leok (born 9 August 1985) is an Estonian motorcycle racer.

He was born in Võru. His father is motorcycle racer Aivar Leok. His cousin is motorcycle racer Tanel Leok.

He has studied at the University of Tartu's Institute of Physical Education.

He is involved with motorsport since 1990, at first coached by his father. In 1999 he won gold medal at European Championships. 2003–2009 he was a member of Estonian national motocross team. He is multiple-times Estonian champion in different motorcycling disciplines.

In 2012, 2013 and 2015, he was named as Best Motorsport Personnel of Estonia.

References

Living people
1985 births
Estonian motorcycle racers
University of Tartu alumni
Sportspeople from Võru